Timbiriche VII is the seventh studio album by Mexican pop group Timbiriche, released on June 29, 1987, by Fonovisa Records. This album marked the beginning of Thalía Sodi's participation in the group and in the same year she also appeared on the Televisa production, Quinceañera.

The group consisted of Paulina Rubio, Alix Bauer, Mariana Garza, Eduardo Capetillo, Erik Rubin, Diego Schoening and Sodi, who replaced Sasha Sökol. The album is the most successful of the group selling over 1 million copies and features the hit singles "Con Todos Menos Conmigo" and "Mírame (Cuestión de Tiempo)".

Background and production
After the release of the album Timbiriche Rock Show, which earned the group a gold record, the member of the group Sasha announced her departure to start her solo career, the producer of the group Luis de Llano invited the singer Thalía, whom he knew since the time of the Din Din group and the musical Vaselina, in which Thalía replaced Sasha in some performances, to replace the singer. The group was formed by: Eduardo Capetillo, Thalía, Diego Schoening, Erik Rubín, Paulina Rubio, Alix Bauer and Mariana Garza. For the production of the album were chosen Fernando Riba, Kiko Campos and Raul Gonzáles Biestro.

Singles
A year before the release of the album and still with the presence of Sasha the group released the song "No Seas Tan Cruel", which was included in the album but the first single from the album was the song "Mírime", which reached the position of #4 on the charts of the magazine Notitas Musicales. The second single from the album, the song "Besos de Ceniza" appeared on the Mexican charts while the first was still well performed, the song reached # 1, becoming the album's biggest hit. The third single from the album was the song "Con Todos Los Conmigo", which reached # 9 on the charts.  The song was made famous in Brazil by the version made by the group Dominó, which was called "Com Todos Menos Comigo". The fourth and final single from the album was the song "Si No Es Ahora", which reached #6 in Mexico. At the same time that the group released the album, member Thalía starred in Televisa's soap opera Quinceañera, for the soundtrack the group recorded the title track, which reached #2 on the charts.

Commercial performance
On May 15, 1988, the Notitas Musicales magazine reported that the album sold 800,000 in Mexico, four months later on September 16, 1988 Mexican magazine Eres published that the album surpassed the 1 million copies sold becoming one of the best selling Mexican albums of all time.

Track listing

See also
 List of best-selling albums in Mexico

References

1987 albums
Timbiriche albums